Liu Chunxian is Major General of People's Republic of China, serving at the General Staff Department of People's Liberation Army.

Born in 1946, he is a native of Wei County in Hebei Province.
He was admitted to the Department of German and Japanese Studies of Beijing Second Foreign Languages Institute in 1965.
During his study, Liu was elected delegate of the 9th CPC National Congress in 1969.
After graduation, he stayed at the university for further study until December 1972, when he was assigned to the PLA General Staff Department.
He served successively as staff officer, division head, Deputy Director and Director General in the military.
In 2003, he was elected member of the 10th CPPCC Shanghai Municipal Committee.

References 

Beijing International Studies University people
1946 births
Living people
People's Liberation Army generals from Hebei
Politicians from Xingtai
Chinese Communist Party politicians from Hebei
People's Republic of China politicians from Hebei